Yerson Ronaldo Chacón Ramírez (born 4 June 2003) is a Venezuelan footballer who plays as a forward for Deportivo Táchira.

International career
Chacón made his debut for the Venezuela national team on 28 January 2022 as an 85th-minute substitute for José Andrés Martínez in a 4–1 home win over Bolivia.

Career statistics

Club

Notes

References

2003 births
Living people
Venezuelan footballers
Venezuela youth international footballers
Association football forwards
Deportivo Táchira F.C. players
Venezuelan Primera División players
Venezuela international footballers
People from San Cristóbal, Táchira